Chadwick Boseman: Portrait of an Artist is a 2021 Netflix special directed by Awol Erizku. It offers a look into the life and career of late actor Chadwick Boseman, which is portrayed through archival footage and interviews with co-stars Viola Davis and Spike Lee. The special premiered on April 17, 2021 and was available on Netflix for 30 days.

References

External links 

Netflix specials
2021 films
Netflix original documentary films
Biographical documentary films
American short documentary films
2020s English-language films
2020s American films
2021 short documentary films